The Imperial Japanese Army Air Service (IJAAS) or  Imperial Japanese Army Air Force (IJAAF) was the aviation force of the Imperial Japanese Army (IJA). Just as the IJA in general was modeled mainly on the German Army, the IJAAS initially developed along similar lines to the Imperial German Army Aviation; its primary mission was to provide tactical close air support for ground forces, as well as a limited air interdiction capability. The IJAAS also provided aerial reconnaissance to other branches of the IJA. While the IJAAS engaged in strategic bombing of cities such as Shanghai, Nanking, Canton, Chongqing, Rangoon, and Mandalay, this was not the primary mission of the IJAAS, and it lacked a heavy bomber force.

It did not usually control artillery spotter/observer aircraft; artillery battalions controlled the light aircraft and balloons that operated in these roles.

The Imperial Japanese Navy Air Service was responsible for long-range bomber and attack aircraft, as well as strategic air defense. It was not until the later stages of the Pacific War that the two air arms attempted to integrate the air defense of the home islands.

History

Origins

The Japanese military became interested in the use of captive balloons in the mid 19th century noted seen their use by European armies. The first experimental ascent by the Japanese was in 1874 at the cadet military school. Japan began to construct its own balloons in 1877 based on a French one they had acquired. Yamada Isaburô, an industrialist, started to develop a hydrogen balloon in 1897. In 1900 he invented a cylindrical kite balloon and sold them to the Imperial Japanese Army. The army first used them operationally during the Russo-Japanese War of 1904-1905 for artillery spotting.

In 1907, Lieutenant Commander Eisuke Yamamoto approached the Ministers of the Army and Navy, General Masatake Terauchi and Admiral Minoru Saito. They formulated an aeronautical policy and established a dedicated military balloon unit. In 1909, together with the Imperial Japanese Navy and the Tokyo Imperial University, the Rinji Gunyo Kikyu Kenkyukai (Temporary Military Balloon Research Association) was set up. The association was chaired by Major General Masahiko Obama and continued to drive Japanese aviation policy until 1920. During March of that year Army Lieutenant Hino and Navy Engineer Sanji Narahara each designed an aircraft. Narahara flew the aircraft on 5 May 1910 making it the first Japanese built plane to do so. Subsequent designs were unsuccessful and the Army and Navy decided to utilise foreign aircraft until they could build a sufficient level of technical skill in Japan to design and build their own aircraft.

In 1910, the society sent Captain Yoshitoshi Tokugawa and Captain Hino Kumazō to France and Germany, respectively, to receive pilot training and purchase aircraft. The Japanese Army purchased its first aircraft, a Farman biplane and a Grade monoplane, which had been brought back by the officers from Western Europe. On December 19, 1909, Captain Yoshitoshi Tokugawa in a Farman III conducted the first successful powered flight on Japanese soil at Yoyogi Parade Ground in Tokyo. The following year in 1911, several more aircraft were imported and an improved version of the Farman III biplane, the Kaishiki No.1, was built and flown in Japan by Captain Togugawa. Also in 1911 a policy decision was made to split the Army and Navy aviation into two separate organisations.

World War 1
In 1914, with the outbreak of war, the Japanese laid siege to the German colony of Tsingtao, aircraft from the army together with the navy conducted reconnaissance and bombing operations. The Provisional Air Corps consisting of four Maurice Farman MF.7 biplanes and a single Nieuport VI-M monoplane flew 86 sorties between them. In December 1915, an air battalion based around 1 air company and 1 balloon company was created under the Army Transport Command and located at Tokorozawa. The Army Transport Command became responsible for all air operations. In total 10 aricraft were added the Army Air Service in 1914 and 1915.

A number of Japanese pilots served with French flying corp during the war. Kiyotake Shigeno joined the corps in December 1914. He was a member of the league of French flying aces having shot down two confirmed and six unconfirmed German aircraft. He also was awarded the Ordre national de la Légion d’honneur, France's highest decoration. Kobayashi Shukunosuke became a licensed pilot in December 1916, dying in combat during the 1918 Spring Offensive. He was posthumously awarded the Croix de Guerre. Isobe Onokichi, Ishibashi Katsunami, Masaru Kaiya (IJN), Tadao Yamanaka, Masatoshi Takeishi, Isakitchy Nagao, and Moro Goroku, a Kawasaki aircraft engineer, also served in the French Flying corp.

Post War

However, serious interest in military aviation did not develop until after World War I. Japanese military observers in Western Europe were quick to spot the advantages of the new technology, and after the end of the war, Japan purchased large numbers of surplus military aircraft, including 20 Sopwith 1½ Strutters, 3 Nieuport 24s, and 6 Spads. To cope with this increase in the number of available aircraft the first flying school was set up at Tozorozawa (Tokorozawa Rikugun Koku Seibi Gakkō) followed by Akeno and Shimoshizu. A French military mission was invited to Japan to help develop aviation. The mission was headed by Jacques-Paul Faure and composed of 63 members to establish the fundamentals of the Japanese aviation, the mission also brought several aircraft including 30 Salmson 2A2 as well as 2 Caquot dirigibles. In 1919 40 Nieuport, 100 Spad XIII, and two Breguet XIV. During this time Japanese aircraft were being used in combat roles during the 1920 Siberian Intervention against the Bolshevik Red Army near Vladivostok.

From 1918 reorgansiation of the Army Air Service, the basic unit of the Service remained the Air Battalion (航空大隊, Kōkū Daitai), with each battalion consisting of two squadrons (中隊, Chutai) with nine aircraft each, plus three reserve aircraft and three earmarked for use by the headquarters, for a total of 24 aircraft per battalion. The officer commanding the chutai was the Chutaicho, whose rank was usually that of captain. The commander's aircraft often had distinctive markings, often a partly or totally scarlet, red, orange or yellow tail.

Aircraft production

The first aircraft factory in Japan, Nakajima Aircraft Company, was founded in 1916 and later obtained a license to produce the Nieuport 24 and Nieuport-Delage NiD 29 C.1 (as the Nakajima Ko-4) as well as the Hispano-Suiza engine. Nakajima later license-produced the Gloster Sparrowhawk and Bristol Jupiter. Similarly, Mitsubishi Heavy Industries started producing aircraft under license from Sopwith in 1921, and Kawasaki Heavy Industries started producing the Salmson 2 A.2 bomber from France, and hired German engineers such as Dr. Richard Vogt to produce original designs such as the Type 88 bomber. Kawasaki also produced aircraft engines under license from BMW. By the end of the 1920s, Japan was producing its own designs to meet the needs of the Army, and by 1935 had a large inventory of indigenous aircraft designs that were technically sophisticated.

Reorganisation
Japanese army aviation was organized into a separate chain of command within the Ministry of War of Japan in 1919. In May 1925, the Imperial Japanese Army Air Corps was established under the command of Lieutenant General Kinichi Yasumitsu, it was regarded as a branch equal to the artillery, cavalry or infantry, and contained 3,700 personnel with about 500 aircraft. Each Air Regiment was a mixed purpose unit, consisting of a mixture of fighter and reconnaissance squadrons.

Commanders
By World War Two the command structure of the Imperial Japanese Air Service fell under three separate areas. Operations were controlled by the Chief of General Staff through the area Army's direct to the Air Army's in each respective area. Training fell under the Inspectorate General of Aviation and personal, administration, and procurement fell under both the Minister of War and the Aviation Headquarters.

Air Army Commanders
See the respective Air Army:
 1st Air Army
 2nd Air Army
 3rd Air Army
 4th Air Army
 5th Air Army
 6th Air Army

Inspectorate General of Aviation
See the Inspectorate General of Aviation

Minister of War
See Ministry of the Army

Aviation Headquarters

Second Sino-Japanese War and World War 2
By 1941, the Japanese Army Air Force had about 1,500 combat aircraft. During the first years of the war, Japan continued technical development and deployment of increasingly advanced aircraft and enjoyed air superiority over most battlefields due to the combat experience of its crews and the handling qualities of its aircraft.

However, as the war continued, Japan found that its production could not match that of the Allies. On top of these production problems, Japan faced continuous combat and thus continued losses. Furthermore, there were continual production disruptions brought on by moving factories from location to location, each transfer with the goal of avoiding the Allied strategic bombing. Between these factors and others, such as the restricted strategic materials, the Japanese found themselves materialistically outmatched.

In terms of manpower, Japan was even worse off. Experienced crews were killed and replacements had not been planned. The Japanese had lost skilled trainers, and they did not have the fuel or the time to use the trainers they did have. Because of this, towards the end of its existence the JAAF resorted to kamikaze attacks against overwhelmingly superior Allied forces.

World War II Aircraft

Important aircraft used by the Imperial Japanese Army Air Force during the Second Sino-Japanese War and World War II were:

Fighters:

 Nakajima Ki-27  Nate
 Nakajima Ki-43  Oscar
 Nakajima Ki-44  Tojo
 Kawasaki Ki-45 Kai  Nick
 Kawasaki Ki-61  Tony
 Nakajima Ki-84  Frank
 Kawasaki Ki-100 
 Mitsubishi Ki-109 

Bombers:

 Mitsubishi Ki-21  Sally
 Mitsubishi Ki-30  Ann
 Kawasaki Ki-32  Mary
 Kawasaki Ki-48  Lily
 Nakajima Ki-49  Helen
 Mitsubishi Ki-67  Peggy

Forward air control aircraft:

 Mitsubishi Ki-51  Sonia
 Kawasaki Ki-102  Randy

Transports:

 Nakajima Ki-34  Thora
 Mitsubishi Ki-57  Topsy
 Kawasaki Ki-56  Thalia
 Kokusai Ki-59  Theresa

Reconnaissance Planes:

 Mitsubishi Ki-15   Babs
 Tachikawa Ki-36  Ida
 Mitsubishi Ki-51  Sonia
 Mitsubishi Ki-46  Dinah

Trainers:

 Tachikawa Ki-9  Spruce
 Tachikawa Ki-17  Cedar
 Tachikawa Ki-55  Ida
 Tachikawa Ki-54  Hickory
 Manshū Ki-79 
 Kokusai Ki-86  Cypress

Other planes:
 Kokusai Ki-76  Stella
 Kayaba Ka-1

Organization

Army Aeronautical Department Sections 
 Commander-in-Chief of Army Air Service Office
 Air Service Staff Department
 General Affairs and Administrative Department
 Inspectorate General of Aviation
 General Affairs Unit of Inspectorate of Army Aviation
 Air Training and Instruction Department
 Imperial Japanese Army Air Service Academy
 Supply Bureau
 Tachikawa Army Air Arsenal
 Army Air Transport Department
 Army Air Intelligence Department

Operational Organization 

With the start of the Second Sino-Japanese War in 1937, operational conditions favored the use of many small units, resulting in the creation of many  or even , each with its own distinctive markings.

Each Air Combat Group was a single-purpose unit consisting typically of three Squadrons, divided into three  of three aircraft each. Together with reserve aircraft and the headquarters flight, an Air Combat Group typically had 45 aircraft (fighter) or up to 30 aircraft (bomber or reconnaissance).

In 1942, the Air Corps were renamed , to mirror the terminology for infantry divisions, but the structure remained the same.

Throughout most of the Pacific War, the Japanese Army Air Service was organized into four Air Armies, with two more added in the final stages of the war:

 1st Air Army – HQ Tokyo, basing in the Kanto Plain covering the Japanese home islands, Taiwan, Korea, Chishima, and Karafuto.
 2nd Air Army - HQ Hsinking, covering Manchukuo
 3rd Air Army - HQ Singapore, covering Southeast Asia
 4th Air Army - HQ Rabaul, covering the Solomon Islands and New Guinea. Eventually based in the Philippines. Dissolved January 1945.
 5th Air Army - HQ Nanking, covering Japanese-occupied portions of southern and eastern China from February 1944.
 6th Air Army – on Kyūshū covering Taiwan and Okinawa

In April 1944, a reorganization of the Japanese Army Air Service occurred. Maintenance and ground service units, formerly a separate command, were merged into the Air Combat Group (Hiko Sentai).

Other changes in the final stages of the war were the formation of "Special Attack Units" and "Air-shaking Units", which were short-lived units with their own names (often taken from Japanese mythology or history) and markings, but located within existing squadrons. These units were specially designated and trained with the mission of air-to-air ramming of Allied bomber aircraft. They usually had their armaments removed and their airframes reinforced.

In the final phase of the war, the Special Attack Units evolved into dedicated suicide units for kamikaze missions.  Around 170 of these units were formed, 57 by the Instructor Air Division alone.  Notionally equipped with 12 aircraft each, it eventually comprised around 2000 aircraft.

The final reorganisation of the took place during preparation for Operation Ketsu-Go, the defence of the home islands in 1945 when all the Air Armies were combined under a centralised command of General Masakazu Kawabe .

Special Operations Forces
Teishin Shudan ("Raiding Group") was the IJA's special forces/airborne unit during World War II. The word teishin may be literally translated as "dash forward", and is usually translated as "raiding". It may also be regarded as similar to the "commando" designation in the terminology of other armies. Called a division, the unit was a brigade-sized force, and was part of the Imperial Japanese Army Air Service (IJAAS). The Teishin units were therefore distinct from the marine parachute units of the Special Naval Landing Forces.

 was an airborne special forces unit of the Imperial Japanese Army formed from Army paratroopers, in late 1944 as a last-ditch attempt to reduce and delay Allied bombing raids on the Japanese home islands. The Giretsu Special Forces unit was commanded by Lieutenant General Kyoji Tominaga.

Strength 
In 1940 the Japanese Army Air Service consisted of the following:
 33,000 personnel
 Over 1,600 aircraft (including 1,375 first line combat aircraft).
 The aircraft were organized into 85 Squadrons;
 36 fighter
 28 light bomber
 22 medium bomber
Total military in August 1945 was 6,095,000 including 676,863 Army Air Service.

First Tachikawa Army Air Arsenal
The Japanese Air Army Force had one technical section, the First Tachikawa Air Army Arsenal, which was in charge of aviation research and development. The Arsenal included a testing section for captured Allied aircraft, the Air Technical Research Laboratory (Koku Gijutsu Kenkyujo).

The Army Air Arsenal was also connected with Tachikawa Hikoki K.K. and Rikugun Kokukosho K.K., the Army-owned and operated aircraft manufacturing companies. much as the IJNAS operated its own firm, the Yokosuka Naval Air Technical Arsenal.

Army Escort-Aircraft Carriers 

Due to the poor relations between the Imperial Japanese Army and Imperial Japanese Navy, the Army found it necessary to procure and operate their own aircraft carriers for the purposes of providing escort and protection for Army transport shipping convoys. These escort/transport carriers were converted from small passenger liners or merchant ships and possessed the capacity to operate from eight to 38 aircraft, depending on type and size, and were also used to transport personnel and tanks.

These vessels included the Taiyō Maru, Unyo Maru, Chuyo Maru, Kaiyō Maru, Shinyo Maru, Kamakura Maru, Akitsu Maru, Nigitsu Maru, Kumano Maru, Yamashiro Maru, Shimane Maru, Chigusa Maru (not completed), and Otakisan Maru (not completed) and were operated by civilian crews with Army personnel manning the light and medium anti-aircraft guns.

Uniforms and equipment 
As an integral part of the IJA, the Army Air Service wore the standard Imperial Japanese Army Uniforms.  Only flying personnel and ground crews wore sky blue trim and stripes, while officers wore their ranks on sky blue patches.

See also 
 List of military aircraft of Japan
 Giretsu special forces
 Teishin Shudan (Army air service airborne/commando division)
 Hikōtai Transport Unit
 Kōkūtai
 Inspectorate General of Aviation
 List of Radars in use by Imperial Japanese Army
 List of Bombs in use by Imperial Japanese Army
 List of weapons on Japanese combat aircraft
 List of Aircraft engines in use of Japanese Army Air Force
 List of foreign aircraft tested by Japanese forces from 1930s to WW2
 List of Japanese trainer aircraft during World War II
 Japanese military aircraft designation systems
 Imperial Japanese Army Air Academy
 Air raids on Japan

References

Bibliography

 
 
 
  
 
 Skates, John Ray. The Invasion of Japan: Alternative to the Bomb. Columbia, South Carolina: University of South Carolina Press, 1994. .

External links
 An introduction to the Japanese Army Air Force
 Images of Axis aircraft: German, Italian and Japanese Army and Navy
 Advanced Japanese aircraft
 General resources on Japanese aircraft
 Some captured aircraft, or aircraft in evaluation
  Japanese armaments, vehicles, aircraft, electronic warfare and some Japanese special weapon technology
 Mark Kaiser, 1997-98, "Unit structure of IJA Air Force" (self-published)

Imperial Japanese Army
Japanese Air Force
Disbanded air forces
Military units and formations of Japan in World War II
Military units and formations established in 1912
Military units and formations disestablished in 1945